Noguchi (野口 lit. "field entrance") is a Japanese surname. Notable people with the surname include:

 Akira Noguchi (野口明), baseball player, older brother of Jirō Noguchi
 Akiyo Noguchi (野口啓代), Japanese climber who won multiple bouldering world cups
 Chiyo Noguchi (野口智代), Award-winning Japanese Athlete
 Fujio Noguchi (野口富士男), novelist
 Goro Noguchi (野口五郎), singer and actor
 Haruchika Noguchi (野口晴哉), the founder of Seitai
 Hideyo Noguchi (野口英世),  bacteriologist, discoverer of the agent of syphilis, depicted on the ¥1000 note
 Hiroshi Noguchi (野口裕司), football player
 Isamu Noguchi (野口勇),  Japanese-American sculptor
 Jirō Noguchi (野口二郎), baseball player, younger brother of Akira Noguchi
 Ken Noguchi (野口健), alpinist
 Kenji Noguchi (野口健司), member of the Shinsengumi
 Koji Noguchi (野口幸司), football player
 Kyō Noguchi
 Osamu Noguchi (野口修), founder of Japanese kickboxing
, Japanese rugby union player
 Shigeki Noguchi (野口茂樹), baseball player
 Shitagau Noguchi (野口遵), businessman
 Soichi Noguchi (野口聡一), astronaut
, Japanese footballer
 Thomas Noguchi (トーマス野口), Japanese-American coroner for Los Angeles County
 Toshihiro Noguchi (野口寿浩), baseball player
, protagonist of the Aliens vs. Predator novel series
 Masaaki Noguchi (野口正明), baseball player
 Mika Noguchi (野口美佳), businesswoman
 Mizuki Noguchi (野口みずき), athlete
 Nawoko Noguchi, also known as Naoko Ken (研ナオコ), singer, actress and television personality
 Neisai Noguchi (野口寧斎), poet
 Ryu Noguchi (野口竜), manga artist and designer
 Susumu Noguchi
 Ujo Noguchi (野口雨情), author
 Yasutada Noguchi (野口安忠), athlete
 Yataro Noguchi (野口弥太郎), painter
 Yone Noguchi (野口米次郎), poet and father of Isamu Noguchi
 Yoshiyuki Noguchi (野口祥順), baseball player
 Noguchi Yuka, Japanese woman educator for preschool education 
 Yukio Noguchi (野口悠紀雄), economist
 Yuri Noguchi (のぐちゆり), voice actress

See also
 Noguchi Museum, displaying works of Isamu Noguchi
 5734 Noguchi, asteroid
 Okinawa woodpecker (noguchigera)

Japanese-language surnames